The volleyball tournaments at the 2016 Summer Olympics in Rio de Janeiro was played between 6 and 21 August. 24 volleyball teams and 48 beach volleyball teams, total 386 athletes, participated in the tournament. The indoor volleyball competition took place at Ginásio do Maracanãzinho in Maracanã, and the beach volleyball tournament was held at Copacabana Beach, in the temporary Copacabana Stadium.

Competition schedule

Events
Four sets of medals were awarded in the following events:

 Indoor volleyball – men (12 teams, 144 athletes)
 Indoor volleyball – women (12 teams, 144 athletes)
 Beach volleyball – men (24 teams, 48 athletes)
 Beach volleyball – women (24 teams, 48 athletes)

Qualification
Each National Olympic Committee was allowed to enter one men's and one women's qualified team in the volleyball tournaments and two men's and two women's qualified teams in the beach volleyball.

Men's volleyball

Women's volleyball

Men's beach volleyball

Women's beach volleyball

Men's indoor competition

The competition consisted of two stages; a preliminary round followed by a knockout stage.

Preliminary round
The teams were divided into two groups of six countries, playing every team in their group once. Three points were awarded for a 3–0 or 3–1 win, two points for a 3–2 win, one point for a 2–3 loss and 0 points for a 1–3 or 0–3 loss. The top four teams per group qualified for the quarter-finals.

Pool A

Pool B

Knockout stage

Women's indoor competition

The competition consisted of two stages; a Preliminary round followed by a knockout stage.

Preliminary round
The teams were divided into two groups of six countries, playing every team in their group once. Three points were awarded for a 3–0 or 3–1 win, two points for a 3–2 win, one point for a 2–3 loss and 0 points for a 1–3 or 0–3 loss. The top four teams per group qualified for the quarter-finals.

Pool A

Pool B

Knockout stage

Men's beach volleyball competition

Knockout stage

Women's beach volleyball competition

Knockout stage

Medal summary

Medal table

Medalists

Indoor volleyball

Beach volleyball

See also
Volleyball at the 2016 Summer Paralympics

References

External links
Volleyball:

 
 
 Volleyball qualification process (olympics.com.au)
 Volleyball qualification website (fivb.com)
 Results Book – Volleyball

Beach volleyball:

 
 
Beach Volleyball qualification process (olympics.com.au)
Beach Volleyball qualification website (fivb.com)
 Results Book – Beach Volleyball

 
2016 Summer Olympics events
2016
2016 in volleyball
Olympic